The 1933 Oklahoma Sooners football team represented the University of Oklahoma in the 1933 college football season. In their second year under head coach Lewie Hardage, the Sooners compiled a 4–4–1 record (3–2 against conference opponents), finished in third place in the Big Six Conference, and outscored their opponents by a combined total of 82 to 70.

No Sooners received All-America honors in 1933, but four Sooners received all-conference honors: guards Ellis Bashara and James Stacy, back Bob Dunlap, and tackle Cassius Gentry.

Schedule

References

Oklahoma
Oklahoma Sooners football seasons
Oklahoma Sooners football